Justin Martinez (born July 14, 1980) is an American film director, cinematographer, visual effects artist, writer and producer. He is a co-creator of Radio Silence, known for their work on the films V/H/S, Devil's Due, and Southbound.

Biography

Radio Silence 
In 2011, Martinez formed Radio Silence with Tyler Gillett, Matt Bettinelli-Olpin and Chad Villella. The group co-directed and co-wrote the 10/31/98 segment of the feature film V/H/S. Radio Silence was brought on to direct a segment for V/H/S after producer Brad Miska saw Mountain Devil Prank Fails Horribly, a found footage short that Martinez created with the group Chad, Matt & Rob. V/H/S premiered at the 2012 Sundance Film Festival It was released theatrically by Magnolia Pictures in October 2012.

In 2013, Radio Silence made Devil's Due for 20th Century Fox. The movie was produced by John Davis and released theatrically in January 2014 to a worldwide audience. Martinez is credited as the Executive Producer, Cinematographer, and Visual Effects Supervisor on the movie.

In 2015, their film Southbound premiered at the Toronto International Film Festival. The movie was picked up for distribution by the Orchard for release in February 2016.

Filmography 
 V/H/S (2012)
 Devil's Due (2014)
 Southbound (2015)

References

External links
 
 Devil's Due

1980 births
Living people
American cinematographers
American film directors
People from Tucson, Arizona
Visual effects supervisors
Film producers from Arizona